Abdisalam Haji Ahmed Liban is a Somali diplomat. As of February 2018 he is the ambassador of Somalia to Pakistan, based at the Somali embassy in Islamabad. Previously, he served as Permanent Secretary to the Foreign Affairs Ministry.

He was Vice President of Galmudug under Mohamed Kiimiko from 2006 to 2009.

References

Living people
Vice presidents of Galmudug
Ambassadors of Somalia to Pakistan
Somalian diplomats
Year of birth missing (living people)